60D may refer to:

 Canon EOS 60D DSLR camera introduced in 2010
 Tesla Model X 60D, all-electric cross-over SUV (CUV/XUV)

See also
 D60 (disambiguation)
 60 (disambiguation)